Rafael de Jesus Bonfim (born 24 July 1991), sometimes known as just Bonfim, is a Brazilian footballer who plays as a central defender for Operário Ferroviário.

External links

1991 births
Living people
Brazilian footballers
Association football defenders
Campeonato Brasileiro Série A players
Campeonato Brasileiro Série B players
Campeonato Brasileiro Série C players
Liga 1 (Indonesia) players
São Bernardo Futebol Clube players
Fortaleza Esporte Clube players
Rio Branco Sport Club players
Coritiba Foot Ball Club players
Clube Atlético Bragantino players
Capivariano Futebol Clube players
Atlético Clube Goianiense players
Cuiabá Esporte Clube players
Johor Darul Ta'zim II F.C. players
Veranópolis Esporte Clube Recreativo e Cultural players
Esporte Clube Juventude players
Clube de Regatas Brasil players
Kalteng Putra F.C. players
Operário Ferroviário Esporte Clube players
Brazilian expatriate footballers
Brazilian expatriate sportspeople in Malaysia
Brazilian expatriate sportspeople in Indonesia
Expatriate footballers in Malaysia
Expatriate footballers in Indonesia
Sportspeople from Salvador, Bahia